The Healers is a 1974 American made-for-television drama film starring John Forsythe, Pat Harrington Jr., Katherine Woodville and Season Hubley. It originally aired May 22, 1974 on NBC.

Synopsis
The director of an urban medical center deals with a variety of problems over the course of running the facility.

Cast
 John Forsythe as Dr. Robert Kier
 Pat Harrington Jr. as Joe Tate
 Katherine Woodville as Claire Parlini
 Season Hubley as Ann Kilmer
 Anthony Zerbe as Dr. Albert Scanlon
 Beverly Garland as Laura Kier
 John McIntire as Dr. Ernest Wilson
 Yvonne Gilbert as Betty Kier
 Lance Kerwin as Kennedy Brown
 Michael C. Gwynne as Dr. Anton Balinowski
 Shelly Juttner as Nikki Kier
 Christian Juttner as Vince Kier
 Ellen Weston as Barbara, Secretary to Dr. Kier

External links

1974 television films
1974 films
1974 drama films
Films directed by Tom Gries
Films scored by David Shire
American drama television films
1970s American films